Artur Eklund (21 February 1880, Pedersöre - 18 August 1927) was a Finnish journalist and politician. He was a member of the Parliament of Finland from 1919 to 1922, representing the Swedish People's Party of Finland (SFP).

References

1880 births
1927 deaths
People from Pedersöre
People from Vaasa Province (Grand Duchy of Finland)
Finnish Lutherans
Swedish People's Party of Finland politicians
Members of the Parliament of Finland (1919–22)
University of Helsinki alumni
20th-century Lutherans